Syntomodrillia portoricana is a species of sea snail, a marine gastropod mollusk in the family Drilliidae.

Description

Distribution

References

portoricana
Gastropods described in 2016